Jeremy Knowles is the name of:
Jeremy R. Knowles (1935–2008), chemistry professor at Harvard University
Jeremy Knowles (swimmer) (born 1981), Bahamian swimmer